Itchoo is a village in Sankoo tehsil in Kargil district of the Indian union territory of Ladakh. The village is located 75 kilometres from the district headquarters Kargil.

Demographics
According to the 2011 census of India, Itchoo had 53 households. The literacy rate of Itchoo village is 54.76%. In Itchoo, Male literacy stands at 67.19% while the female literacy rate was 41.94%.

Transportation
Itchoo lacks transportation services as there is no road to this village. One has to take a trail from Barsoo village after reaching Barsoo from Sankoo by the Barsoo Road and NH 301. There is no rail or air connectivity to Itchoo. The nearest airport is at Leh, located at a distance of 300 kilometres.

See also
Ladakh
Kargil
Drass
Rangdum

References

Villages in Sankoo tehsil